The Libertador Municipality is one of the 23 municipalities (municipios) that makes up the Venezuelan state of Mérida and, according to a 2007 population estimate by the National Institute of Statistics of Venezuela, the municipality has a population of 232,011.  The city of Mérida is the shire town of the Libertador Municipality. The municipality is one of a number in Venezuela named "Libertador Municipality", in honour of Venezuelan independence hero Simón Bolívar.

References

External links
libertador-merida.gob.ve 

Municipalities of Mérida (state)